Moshe Aryeh Freund (1904–1996) was a rabbi and the (av beis din) of the Edah HaChareidis in Jerusalem. He wrote a book called Ateres Yehoshua, a name by which he himself was occasionally called. He was a Satmar hasid.

He was born in 1904 in the Hungarian town of Honiad, where his father, Yisroel Freund, was av beis din. His mother was named Soroh. At 18 he married a distant relative.

Before the Second World War he was rosh yeshiva in the Hungarian town of Sǎtmar (now Satu Mare, Romania). The Nazis arrested him and his entire family in 1944. The family was deported to Auschwitz, where only Freund survived; his wife and all of his nine children were killed by the Nazis.

In 1951 he moved to Jerusalem where in 1979, he was elected av beis din of the Edah HaChareidis, a position which he held until his death.

References

External links 
 Zichru Toras Moshe Aryeh: Divrei Torah and Masios from Rabbi Moshe Aryeh Freund

1894 births
1996 deaths
Hasidic rabbis in Israel
Rabbis of the Edah HaChareidis
Satmar rabbis
Auschwitz concentration camp survivors
Hungarian emigrants to Israel
Hungarian Orthodox rabbis
Anti-Zionist Hasidic rabbis
Hungarian centenarians
Men centenarians